is a short nine-minute film written and directed by Yasuhiro Yoshiura. It aired 26 October 2002 in NHK BS1's, 10 min. theater slot.

Synopsis & Style
Aquatic Language tries to relay to the audience the importance of language; and the need for communication. It mixes 2D and 3D visual techniques with dramatic camera movements and angles to enhance its dialogue.

Voice cast
 Rina Matsufuji as Waitress
 Yasuhiro Yoshiura as Protagonist
 Mayo Saksegawa as Gossipy Girl
 Chihiro Kusano as Cool Girl
 Akihiro Yoshiura as Small Guy
 Yuusuke Sakaguchi as Big Guy
 Satoshi Watanabe as Bookworm

Staff
Writer & Director - Yasuhiro Yoshiura
Music - Satoshi Watanabe

Awards
 Excellent Work Award, Tokyo International Anime Fair, 2003.

External links
 Official Site for Mizu no Kotoba

References

2002 anime OVAs
Films directed by Yasuhiro Yoshiura